Electro-Shock for President is the second extended play from the band Brainiac. The band decided to use only electronic equipment instead of guitars to demonstrate the band's ever-evolving sound. This EP was intended to be a teaser for Brainiac's fourth album, expected to be their major label debut on Interscope Records. However, vocalist and keyboard player Tim Taylor died in a car accident shortly after the EP's release.

Trent Reznor of Nine Inch Nails noted in a BBC radio show (May 2005) that Brainiac was "really inspiring to me from a sonic standpoint." He went on to say that while recording 2005's With Teeth, he would use Electro-Shock for President as a sound reference.

Track listing

Personnel
Brainiac
Tim Taylor – vocals, keyboards
John Schmersal – electric guitar, keyboards
Tyler Trent – drums
Juan Monasterio – bass guitar

References

1997 EPs
Brainiac (band) EPs
Touch and Go Records EPs